Jayson Kyle Stanley (born April 24, 1997) is an American football cornerback who is currently a free agent. He was signed by the Atlanta Falcons as an undrafted free agent in 2019 following his college football career with the Georgia Bulldogs.

Professional career

Atlanta Falcons
Stanley signed with the Atlanta Falcons as an undrafted free agent following the 2019 NFL Draft on April 29, 2019. He was waived during final roster cuts with an injury settlement on August 31, 2019.

Miami Dolphins
Stanley signed to the Miami Dolphins' practice squad on October 16, 2019, and was released on October 30.

Jacksonville Jaguars
Stanley signed to the Jacksonville Jaguars' practice squad on December 19, 2019. After the 2019 NFL season, he signed a reserve/futures contract with the Jaguars on January 2, 2020. He was waived on April 27, 2020.

Seattle Seahawks
The Seattle Seahawks claimed Stanley off waivers from the Jaguars on April 28, 2020. He was waived during final roster cuts on September 5, 2020, and signed to the practice squad the next day. He was elevated to the active roster on October 31 and November 7 for the team's weeks 8 and 9 games against the San Francisco 49ers and Buffalo Bills, and reverted to the practice squad after each game. He was signed to the active roster on November 19, 2020. He was placed on injured reserve on January 6, 2021.

Green Bay Packers
On December 29, 2021, Stanley was signed to the Green Bay Packers practice squad. He was released on January 4, 2022.

Chicago Bears
On June 21, 2022, Stanley signed with the Chicago Bears. He was waived/injured on August 16, 2022 and placed on injured reserve. He was released with an injury settlement on August 25.

References

External links
Seattle Seahawks bio
Georgia Bulldogs bio

1997 births
Living people
People from Fairburn, Georgia
Players of American football from Georgia (U.S. state)
Sportspeople from Fulton County, Georgia
American football wide receivers
American football cornerbacks
Georgia Bulldogs football players
Atlanta Falcons players
Miami Dolphins players
Jacksonville Jaguars players
Seattle Seahawks players
Green Bay Packers players
Chicago Bears players